PS Hibernia was a paddle steamer passenger vessel operated by the Chester and Holyhead Railway from 1847 to 1859 and the London and North Western Railway from 1859 to 1877.

History

She was built by Thomas Vernon of Liverpool for the Chester and Holyhead Railway. On 27 September 1849, she towed the disabled  in to Holyhead, Anglesey. Cambria had suffered a broken main shaft. The Chester and Holyhead Railway was taken over by the London and North Western Railway in 1859.

She was sold to the Waterford and Limerick Railway in 1877 and used as a hulk until 1897. She foundered off the Smalls on 25 July 1897 on the way to the breaker's yard.

References

1847 ships
Passenger ships of the United Kingdom
Steamships of the United Kingdom
Ships built on the River Mersey
Ships of the London and North Western Railway
Paddle steamers of the United Kingdom